This is a complete discography of the British recording artist John Foxx.

Albums

Studio albums

Ultravox!
1977 - Ultravox!
1977 - Ha! Ha! Ha!
1978 - Systems of Romance

As John Foxx
 1980 - Metamatic (# 18 UK), (# 98 AUS)
 1981 - The Garden (# 24 UK)
 1983 - The Golden Section (# 27 UK)
 1985 - In Mysterious Ways (# 85 UK)
 1997 - Cathedral Oceans
 2003 - Cathedral Oceans I + Cathedral Oceans II (02/06/2003)
 2005 - Cathedral Oceans III (08/08/2005)
 2006 - The Hidden Man (2CD interview set, a reading from The Quiet Man and three new songs.)
 2006 - Tiny Colour Movies
 2007 - Metal Beat (2CD interview set between Steve Malins and John Foxx, discussing the making of Metamatic.)
 2009 - My Lost City (23/02/2009)
 2009 - The Quiet Man (Extracts from the ongoing Quiet Man book read by Justin Barton, together with a new piano score by John Foxx - 27/07/2009)
 2010 - D.N.A. (06/2010)
 2014 - B-Movie (Ballardian Video Neuronica)  (14/04/2014)
 2015 - London Overgrown (30/03/2015)
 2016 - Complete Cathedral Oceans 12" vinyl LP Box Set  (02/09/2016) - “Cathedral Oceans I” (1997), “Cathedral Oceans II” (2003) and “Cathedral Oceans III” (2005) on five LPs.
 2022 - The Marvellous Notebook
 2023 - Avenham

As John Foxx and Louis Gordon
1997 - Shifting City
1997 - Subterranean Omnidelic Exotour EP - recorded live in the studio
1998 - Subterranean Omnidelic Exotour
2001 - The Pleasures of Electricity
2003 - Crash and Burn
2003 - The Drive EP
2003 - The Omnidelic Exotour - Subterranean Omnidelic Exotour re-release with The Golden Section Tour CD
2006 - Live From A Room (As Big As A City) - recorded live in the studio
2006 - From Trash
2006 - Sideways - with second bonus disc featuring an interview with John Foxx
2008 - Sideways - re-issue with second disc featuring live tracks, remixes and extended versions
2008 - Impossible
2009 - Shifting City - 2 disc remaster
2009 - The Pleasures of Electricity - 2 disc remaster
2010 - Crash and Burn - re-issue with bonus disc

Crash And Burn and From Trash were also released as part of the John Foxx boxset Cinemascope (2008)

As John Foxx and the Maths
 2011 - Interplay
 2011 - The Shape of Things
 2012 - Evidence
 2012 - Rhapsody - recorded live in the studio, shortly after 2011's Interplay tour.
 2014 - The Good Shadow  - digital release only featuring eight tracks which originally appeared on the second disc of  The Shape Of Things 
 2017 - The Machine
 2020 - Howl (# 80 UK)

Live albums

As John Foxx
2003 - The Golden Section Tour - released together with The Omnidelic Exotour with Louis Gordon
2008 - A New Kind of Man - live performances of all Metamatic and related tracks.
2009 - In the Glow - recorded on The Golden Section tour, 1983.

As John Foxx and Louis Gordon
2007 - Retro Future - recorded on the Exotour, on 10 January 1998 at Shrewsbury Music Hall
2008 - Neuro Video - recorded at The Luminaire in London, on 24 November 2007.

Compilation albums

With Ultravox
1980 - Three Into One
1993 - Slow Motion
1999 - The Island Years (as Ultravox!)
2016 - Ultravox!: The Island Years 4-CD boxset

As John Foxx
1992 - Assembly
2001 - Modern Art – The Best of John Foxx
2008 - Glimmer - Best of John Foxx
2008 - Cinemascope - boxset including Crash and Burn (2003), Cathedral Oceans III (2005), Tiny Colour Movies (2006), From Trash (2006), Electrofear (as Nation 12) (2005) and Cathedral Oceans DVD (featuring the music of Cathedral Oceans III).
2010 - The Complete Cathedral Oceans boxset including Cathedrals Oceans I, II & III on CD and III on DVD
2010 - Metatronic
2013 - Metadelic
2014 - The Virgin Years 1980-1985 - CD boxset including Metamatic (1980), The Garden (1981), The Golden Section (1983), In Mysterious Ways (1985), Fusion/Fission (compilation of bonus tracks).
2015 - 20th Century: The Noise
2016 - Burning Car EP (vinyl only)
2016 - 21st Century. A Man, A Woman and A City

Other collaborations
2003 - Translucence/Drift Music - John Foxx + Harold Budd
2005 - Electrofear - Nation 12
2005 - Dualizm Jori Hulkkonen feat. John Foxx on Dislocated
2005 - Dislocated (EP) - Jori Hulkkonen feat. John Foxx
2008 - Never been Here Before (EP) - Jori Hulkkonen feat. John Foxx
2009 - A Secret Life - D'Agostino/Foxx/Jansen - with Steve D'Agostino and Steven Jansen
2009 - Mirrorball - John Foxx and Robin Guthrie
2010 - 4'33'''' - Cage Against The Machine
2012 - Nighthawks - John Foxx and Harold Budd featuring Ruben Garcia - issued with re-release of Translucence and Drift Music
2013 - European Splendour EP - John Foxx + Jori Hulkkonen (with a remix by David Lynch on the Deluxe version)
2013 - Empty Avenues EP - John Foxx and The Belbury Circle (with a remix by Pye Corner Audio)
2014 - Evidence Of Time Travel - John Foxx and Steve D’Agostino (Limited Edition LP & CD, released October 2014) 
2015 - Codex album - as Ghost Harmonic (with Benge and Diana Yukawa) (announced for May 2015 release)Ghost Harmonic website

Singles and EPs

Tiger Lily

"Monkey Jive"/"Ain’t Misbehavin’" 7" (1975)

Ultravox!

"Dangerous Rhythm" (1977)
"Young Savage" (1977)
"ROckWrok" (1977)
"Quirks" (1977)
"Frozen Ones" (1977)
"Slow Motion" (1978) - re-issued 1981 (# 33 UK)
"Quiet Men" (1978)

As John Foxx
"Underpass" (1980) (# 31 UK)
"No-One Driving" (1980) (# 32 UK)
"Burning Car" (1980) (# 35 UK)
"My Face" (1980) - flexi-disc that came with Smash Hits vol. 2, no. 20
"Miles Away" (1980) (# 51 UK)
"Europe After the Rain" (1981) (# 40 UK)
"Dancing Like a Gun" (1981)
"Endlessly" (1982) - first version
"Endlessly" (1983) (# 66 UK) - new version
"Your Dress" (1983) (# 61 UK)
"Like a Miracle" (1983)
"Stars On Fire" (1985) (# 89 UK)
"Enter the Angel" (1985)

As John Foxx and the Maths

2009 - Destination/September Town (digital download only)

Other collaborations
1985 - Heaven - Anne Clark - 7" and 12" versions co-written and produced by John Foxx
2008 - Dislocated (EP) - Jori Hulkkonen feat. John Foxx
2008 - Never been Here Before (EP) - Jori Hulkkonen feat. John Foxx
2012 - Changelings (John Foxx and the Maths remix) by Gazelle Twin on the album The Entire City Remixed 
2013 - Dresden (John Foxx and the Maths remix) by OMD from the "Dresden" single EP, released May 2013
2013 - Blood Diamonds'' (John Foxx & The Maths Remix) by Simple Minds, digital release December 2013

References

External links 

 Official website discography
 
 
 

 
 
Pop music discographies
Electronic music discographies
Discographies of British artists
Rock music discographies
Rock music group discographies
Alternative rock discographies
New wave discographies